Carl Township is one of the five townships of McPherson County, South Dakota, United States.  It lies in the northeastern part of the county and borders the following other townships within McPherson County:
Wachter Township — north
Weber Township — northwest corner

External links
Official map by the United States Census Bureau; McPherson County listed on page 5

Townships in McPherson County, South Dakota
Townships in South Dakota